Muteh (also Romanized as Mūteh; also known as Nūteh) is a village in Zarkan Rural District, Meymeh District, Shahin Shahr and Meymeh County, Isfahan Province, Iran. At the 2006 census, its population was 908, in 242 families.

References 

Populated places in Shahin Shahr and Meymeh County